Soriano is a department of Uruguay. Its capital is Mercedes. It is located on the west of the country, south of Río Negro Department, north of Colonia Department and west of Flores Department. Its western border is the Río Uruguay, separating it from Argentina.

History
In 1624, a Franciscan Mission established a reduction for the indigenous tribes of the area named Santo Domingo Soriano. In spite of interruptions in its existence, it is considered the earliest populated centre of the actual Uruguay. Eventually, in its place Villa Soriano was founded.

The first division of Uruguay in departments happened on 27 January 1816. At the time, eight departments were formed, with Soriano being one of them. When the first constitution was signed in 1830, Soriano Department was one of the nine original departments of the Republic.

Demographics

As of the census of 2011, Soriano Department had a population of 82,592 (40.853 male and 41.742 female) and 32,075 households.

Demographic data for Soriano Department in 2010:
Population growth rate: 0.558%
Birth rate: 16.60 births/1,000 people
Death rate: 9.41 deaths/1,000 people
Average age: 31.7 (30.8 male, 32.6 female)
Life expectancy at birth:
Total population: 76.32 years
Male: 73.47 years
Female: 79.26 years
Average per household income: 25,198 pesos/month
Urban per capita income: 9,648 pesos/month
2010 Data Source:

Map of the department

Noted locality
 Agraciada Beach, a historically important location in Uruguay's past, associated with the Thirty-Three Orientals.

Notable people
 Juan Idiarte Borda, from Soriano, was President of Uruguay from 1894 to 1897
 Tomás Gomensoro Albín, from Soriano, was President of Uruguay (interim) from 1872 to 1873
 Jesús Posse, rower
 Santiago Ostolaza, from Dolores, football player

See also
 List of populated places in Uruguay#Soriano Department

References

External links
Official site of Soriano
Soriano Turismo (Ministry of Tourism and Sports) 
www.todosoriano.com.uy
INE map of Soriano Department
Nuestra Terra, Colección Los Departamentos, Vol.7 "Soriano"

 
Departments of Uruguay
States and territories established in 1816
1816 establishments in Uruguay